Ramsden Estate may refer to:

 Ramsden Estate (Huddersfield), the holdings of the former manor of Huddersfield, Yorkshire, England
 Ramsden Estate (Orpington), a housing estate in Orpington, London, England